Metallolophia inanularia is a moth of the family Geometridae first described by Hong-Xiang Han and Da-Yong Xue in 2004. It is found in Guangxi, China.

References

Moths described in 2004
Pseudoterpnini